Marion Don Flanagan (March 27, 1924 – March 1, 2002) was an American football player.  He was born in Sweetwater, Texas, played high school football there, and was one of the top high school players in the state.  He played college football for the Texas A&M Aggies football team as a halfback, quarterback, and fullback from 1942 to 1943 and in 1946.  He led the NCAA major colleges in 1942 with 403 receiving yards. Flanagan sustained a knee injury in 1943 that prematurely ended his season. After the 1943 season, Flanagan spent two-and-a-half years serving in the United States Navy during World War II.  After his discharge, he returned to Texas A&M and was one of the leading punt returners in the 1946 season.  He opted not to return to football in 1947, stating that he was retiring from the game due to the lingering impact of the knee injury he sustained in 1943. In September 1947, Flanagan married Janette Butts. He also served as an assistant football coach at Texas A&M in 1947.

See also
 List of NCAA major college football yearly receiving leaders
 List of NCAA major college yearly punt and kickoff return leaders

References

1924 births	
2002 deaths
American football halfbacks
Texas A&M Aggies football players
Players of American football from Texas
People from Sweetwater, Texas